Bartolomeu Dragfi de Beltiug ( b. 1447 – d. 1501) was Voivode of Transylvania from 1493 until 1499, Count of the Székelys from 1479 until 1488, Comes Perpetuus of Middle Szolnok. He was a member of the House of Dragoș and  a descendant of Dragoș, Voivode of Moldavia.

Ancestry

 sources:

Voivode of Transylvania 
Bartolomeu Dragfi was appointed voivode of Transylvania in 1493. Until 1495, another Transylvanian voivode ruled alongside Ladislaus de Losoncz II. As a voivode, he supported Stephen III of Moldavia, in 1497 against John I Albert, king of Poland.

References

Sources
 Joódy Pál - Cercetarea calitắții de nobil in comitatul Maramures. Anii 1749-1769, Editura societắții culturale Pro Maramures "Dragos Vodắ", Cluj-Napoca, 2003
 Joan cavaler de Puscariu - Date istorice privitoare la familiile nobile romắne. Editura societắții culturale Pro Maramures "Dragos Vodắ", Cluj-Napoca, 2003
 Prof. Alexandru Filipascu de Dolha si Petrova - Istoria Maramuresului, Editura "Gutinul" Baia Mare, 1997.
 Wyrostek, Ludwik - Rod Dragow-Sasow na Wegrzech i Rusi Halickiej. RTH t. XI/1931-1932

House of Dragoș
1447 births
1501 deaths
Voivodes of Transylvania